Antoni Kozubal (born 18 August 2004) is a Polish professional footballer who plays as a midfielder for I liga club GKS Katowice, on loan from Lech Poznań.

Career statistics

Club

Honours
Lech Poznań
 Ekstraklasa: 2021–22

References

2004 births
Living people
Polish footballers
Poland youth international footballers
Association football midfielders
Lech Poznań II players
Lech Poznań players
Górnik Polkowice players
GKS Katowice players
II liga players
I liga players
Ekstraklasa players
People from Krosno